The 1973 Svenska Cupen final took place on 31 May 1973 at Stadsparksvallen in Jönköping. The match was contested by Allsvenskan sides Malmö FF and Åtvidabergs FF. The two clubs had faced each other just two years earlier in the 1971 Final . Åtvidaberg played their fourth final in total, Malmö FF played their ninth final in total. Malmö FF won their seventh title with a 7–0 victory.

Match details

External links
Svenska Cupen at svenskfotboll.se

1973
Cupen
Malmö FF matches
Åtvidabergs FF matches
May 1973 sports events in Europe
Sports competitions in Jönköping